List of fossiliferous stratigraphic units in England
List of fossiliferous stratigraphic units in Wales
List of fossiliferous stratigraphic units in Scotland
List of fossiliferous stratigraphic units in Northern Ireland

United Kingdom geology-related lists
Geology of the United Kingdom
 United Kingdom